Amauris dannfelti is a butterfly in the family Nymphalidae. It is found in the Democratic Republic of the Congo, Angola and Zambia.

Subspecies
Amauris dannfelti dannfelti (Angola)
Amauris dannfelti restricta Talbot, 1940 (northern Zambia, Democratic Republic of the Congo: south-east to Shaba and Maniema)

References

Butterflies described in 1891
Amauris
Butterflies of Africa